The Moncton Law Courts is a courthouse building in Downtown Moncton, New Brunswick. It is one of several courthouses which host hearings of the Court of Queen's Bench of New Brunswick and the Provincial Court of New Brunswick.

The complex, which covers about 12,150 square metres (135,000 sq. ft.), features 15 courtrooms, two hearing rooms, a new secure detention centre as well as chambers for the judiciary. It also has offices for court services administration personnel, public prosecutions, lawyers, sheriffs, police and staff from other provincial departments.  The first court session in the building was February 14, 2011.  Prior to this, the Moncton Courthouse was in the Moncton Assumption Building.

During construction, the complex came under fire for the almost double price tag of the initial cost of completion.

References

Buildings and structures in Moncton
Courthouses in Canada
Modernist architecture in Canada
Public–private partnership projects in Canada